Protozoology is the study of protozoa, the "animal-like" (i.e., motile and heterotrophic) protists. The Protozoa are considered to be a subkingdom of Protista. They are free-living organisms that are found in almost every habitat. All humans have protozoan found living on their body, and many people may be infected with one or more throughout their life.

Anton van Leeuwenhoek was the first person to discover Protozoa using a microscope that he constructed himself. This term has become dated as an understanding of the evolutionary relationships of the eukaryotes has improved.  For example, the Society of Protozoologists, founded in 1947, was renamed International Society of Protistologists in 2005. However, the term persists in some cases (e.g., the Polish journal Acta Protozoologica).

Example: The study of Amoebae and Plasmodium is done by protozoologists.

Example: Toxoplasmosis and giardiasis are diseases caused by protozoa.

Example:  Cryptosporidium is a parasitic protozoan, that is found in the intestinal tract.

External links
 The Society of Protozoologists
 Corliss, J. O. (1978). A salute to fifty-four great microscopists of the past: a pictorial footnote to the history of protozoology. Part I. Transactions of the American Microscopical Society, 97: 419-458, .
 Corliss, J. O. (1979). A salute to fifty-four great microscopists of the past: a pictorial footnote to the history of protozoology. Part II. Transactions of the American Microscopical Society, 98: 26-58, .
 Corliss, J. O. (1997). Some Important Anniversaries in the History of Protozoology. Rev. Soc. Mex. Hist. Nat. 47: 5-17, .
 Vickerman, K., Sleigh, M., Leadbetter, B., & McCready, S. (2000). A Century of Protozoology in Britain. British Section of the Society of Protozoologists, London, .
 Wolf, M., & Hausmann, K. (2001). Protozoology from the perspective of science theory: history and concept of a biological discipline. Linzer biol. Beitr. 33: 461-488, .

References

Protista